The 1953 Cotton Bowl Classic featured the Tennessee Volunteers and the Texas Longhorns. This was the first Cotton Bowl Classic to be broadcast on television.

Background
The Longhorns were in their first Bowl appearance under Price, in his second season with the team. They had won the Southwest Conference for the first time since 1950. The Volunteers finished 2nd in the Southeastern Conference in Neyland's final season.

Game summary
Midway through the first quarter, Dave Griffith was tackled by Carlton Massey for a safety after trying to do a fake punt...on first down. After a fumble by Ray Byrd was recovered by Clifford Polk early in the second quarter, Gib Dawson scored on a 4-yard touchdown run 7 plays later to give Texas a 9-0 lead at halftime. Midway through the fourth quarter, Jim Rosser recovered a Vols fumble and seven plays later, Billy Quinn scored on a touchdown run seal Tennessee's fate as the Longhorns got revenge on what happened two Cotton Bowls earlier. Despite both teams losing three fumbles, Tennessee cost them more dearly and led to 14 points for Texas.

Aftermath
Price would win the SWC again, but a 1-9 season in 1956 led to Price's resignation, leading the way for Darrell Royal to be hired. Harvey Robinson took over for the Vols after Neyland's retirement, but it would take him being fired before the Vols returned to a bowl game under his replacement.

Statistics

References

Cotton Bowl Classic
Cotton Bowl Classic
Tennessee Volunteers football bowl games
Texas Longhorns football bowl games
January 1953 sports events in the United States
Cotton Bowl